Frank "Pos" Elam was a college football player.

Middle Tennessee State
He attended Middle Tennessee State Normal School before and after his year at Vanderbilt.

Vanderbilt University
Elam was a prominent tackle for Dan McGugin's Vanderbilt Commodores football team of Vanderbilt University. He was a member of the Delta Tau Delta fraternity.

1921
Elam recovered a fumble in the Sewanee game of 1921 to set up the game's only touchdown, scored by Hek Wakefield. Elam was on Walter Camp's list of all players worthy of mention. He was selected All-Southern by George A. Butler of the Chattanooga News.

References

American football tackles
Vanderbilt Commodores football players
All-Southern college football players
Players of American football from Tennessee
People from Smyrna, Tennessee